Mesonia ostreae is a Gram-negative and aerobic bacterium from the genus of Mesonia which has been isolated from seawater from an oyster farm from the South Sea.

References

Flavobacteria
Bacteria described in 2012